SnipSnap is a mobile coupon app founded in Philadelphia that allows users to take a photograph of a printed coupon in order to find or create a mobile coupon, which can be redeemed in store.

Overview
The app scans the text, images, logos, and barcodes within the coupon photograph in order to parse out all of the structured coupon content dynamically. The app uses some of this information to power features such as expiration-date reminders, location-based notifications (utilizing the store name, as well as the location of the phone), and scanable barcodes. The app is currently available for iOS (iPhone and iPod Touch only) and Android devices.

SnipSnap is a mobile coupon application that allows users to take a photograph of a printed coupon in order to find or create a mobile coupon, which can later be redeemed at the register. The app scans the images, logos, and barcodes of the original coupon in order to recreate a mobile coupon, similar to what consumers would find printed in a store advertisement. This app is currently available for Android and iOS devices (iPhone and iPod Touch only). SnipSnap also allows users to report if a coupon was accepted in store or not, which creates a success score rating for each stored coupon on the app.  The vast majority of the coupons are shared by SnipSnap users. However, not every coupon can be redeemed successfully due to differing store coupon policies and/or the inability of a store’s point of sale hardware to scan the mobile barcode. SnipSnap does not currently work with manufacturer coupons, but the company is in the process of accepting those types coupons inside the app. SnipSnap surpassed 1 million users in June 2013 and saw over 20 million coupons snipped in its first year.

SnipSnap makes money through both targeted and affiliate offers. Depending on your past habits and SnipSnap’s partnerships, companies, like Babies ‘R Us, can push coupons that look just like any other user-clipped coupon. For every “snip” of one of these coupons that results in an actual purchase, SnipSnap will get a kickback.

According to Mobile Commerce Daily, SnipSnap also works with retailers to manage location-based and "geo-conquesting" campaigns. The company has also begun promoting coupon content outside of its mobile apps, and via third-party social media sites, mobile aps, and ad networks.

Background 

SnipSnap, based in Philadelphia, Pennsylvania, was founded by Ted Mann in September 2011, after Mann left his job at Gannett to start the company. It was incubated at DreamIt Ventures, a startup accelerator program in Philadelphia. It has investors that include venture capital firm MentorTech Ventures, as well as Michael G. Rubin (co-founder of GSI Commerce). The company has raised $1.5 million in seed funding. In November 2013, Valpak announced a partnership to syndicate all of its coupon content to SnipSnap.

Media coverage 

SnipSnap won a MediaPost Appy award for the Best Finance App of 2013, and the award for Best Shopping App of 2013 by About.com. The app was featured on the Katie Couric and Dave Ramsey shows in May 2013.,

Awards and accolades 

MediaPost Appy Award for the Best Finance App of 2013
About.com Best Shopping App of 2013
TechCrunch Disrupt Finalist
Winner of Switch 3 Startup demo competition.

References

External links 
Official website

Mobile software